The 2021 Finns Party leadership election was held in Jyväskylä, Finland, on 14 August 2021. All members of the party who had paid their subscription were allowed to vote in the election.

In June 2021, the incumbent party chair Jussi Halla-aho, who had led the party since 2017, informed that he would not run for re-election as chairman of the party, but would continue his role in parliament and his municipality. 

Riikka Purra won the election in the first round with over 50% of the vote.

Candidates
 Riikka Purra, MP for Uusimaa
 Sakari Puisto, MP for Pirkanmaa
 Ossi Tiihonen, councillor in Lohja
 Kristiina Ilmarinen, MP candidate for Finland Proper in 2019, economist based in Salo

Notable endorsements

Opinion polls

Results 
Riikka Purra was elected party leader, earning 63.76% of valid votes. A few months after the election, in December 2021, Ossi Tiihonen left PS and applied to join Power Belongs to the People.

See also

 Politics of Finland

References

Further reading 

Finns Party
2021 in Finland
Political party leadership elections in Finland
Finns Party leadership election